Raisin Bombers was the colloquial name given by Berliners to the Western Allied (American and British) transport aircraft which brought in supplies by airlift to West Berlin during the Soviet Berlin Blockade in 1948/1949.  In American English they were called Candy Bombers.

History

The name came from the fact that some pilots started voluntarily to throw sweets and candy (and, presumably, also raisins) on little tinkered parachutes out of the window to children lined up on the edges of the West Berlin airfields watching the planes. These actions were first attributed to American pilot Gail Halvorsen, nicknamed "Uncle Wiggly Wings", who began to drop chocolate bars he had attached handkerchiefs to while approaching Tempelhof Airport. Upon comprehensive coverage in the media, drops were ordered expanded by Lt. General William H. Tunner as "Operation Little Vittles".

As this gesture became well known, it enjoyed considerable support with the US public. Halvorsen and his comrades received large support in form of more and more donations of candy from the confectionery industry while civilian volunteers made the parachutes for the delivery. These actions contributed to the development of post war German-American relations.

Today the name Rosinenbomber is commonly applied to several historic types of military aircraft involved in the Berlin Airlift, foremost the four-engined Douglas C-54 Skymaster and the Douglas C-47 Skytrain. A sightseeing C-47 was badly damaged in a crash landing on Schönefeld Airport in 2010 (injuring seven passengers) and is currently being restored. Another C-47 is on display at the German Museum of Technology in Berlin. A British Handley Page Hastings aircraft is on exhibition at the Berlin Allied Museum.

See also
 Berlin Blockade
 Marshall Plan
 History of Berlin

References 
Cherny, Andrei. Candy Bombers: The Untold Story of the Berlin Airlift and America's Finest Hour (2008)
 Huschke, Wolfgang J., The Candy Bombers. The Berlin Airlift 1948/49. Berlin: Metropol, 1999.

External links
 Berlin-Airlift Veterans Association 
 "Why We Did What We Did"   Personal accounts of the Raisin Bombers in the Berlin Airlift
 Rosinenbomber  Haus der Geschichte der Bundesrepublik Deutschland (Museum in Bonn, Germany)
 Operation Plainfare British contribution to the Berlin Airlift

1940s United States bomber aircraft
Cold War history of Germany
1949 in military history
Berlin Blockade